Clevedon Cricket Club is an English amateur cricket club based in Clevedon, North Somerset. The club was established in 1874 and is one of the leading clubs around the Bristol and Somerset area. The club is located at the top of one of the seven hills in Clevedon and overlooks the Mendips and Bristol Channel from its ground at Dial Hill.

Clevedon CC have 4 men’s Saturday teams with the 1st XI competing in the West of England Premier League, which is an accredited ECB Premier League, the highest level for recreational club cricket in England and Wales.

In 2012, Clevedon CC finished second in the Bristol & Somerset division before being promoted as champions in 2013. The following season, in 2014, Clevedon CC achieved a second promotion in as many years when they finished runners-up to Ilminster CC by 1 point. Since the 2015 season Clevedon CC have been playing in the Premier One division of the West of England Premier League.

Notable current and former players

References

External links 
Clevedon cricket club — about us (archived 2013)

Cricket in Somerset
English club cricket teams
Clevedon